Graskruid is a station on lines A and B of the Rotterdam Metro and is situated in the northeastern part of Rotterdam. At Graskruid station, the track splits into the two station short Line A branch and the longer Line B branch. The station consists of an island platform between two running tracks.

This station was opened on 28 May 1983 when the East-West Line (also formerly called Caland line) was extended from its previous terminus Capelsebrug.

Rotterdam Metro stations
Railway stations opened in 1983
1983 establishments in the Netherlands
Railway stations in the Netherlands opened in the 20th century